was a Japanese painter. He was the chief painter of the Ashikaga shogunate and is generally considered the founder of the Kanō school of painting. Kano Masanobu specialized in Zen paintings as well as elaborate paintings of Buddhist deities and Bodhisattvas.

Life and work 
Masanobu's father had been a samurai and amateur artist named Kanō Kagenobu. Masanobu would start the line of professional artists of the Kanō family. As an artist, Masanobu, like many in his day, was influenced by the priest-painter Tenshō Shūbun, and some sources indicate that he may have received the bulk of his artistic education under Shūbun. Masanobu worked in the suiboku ink and wash style, derived from Chinese painting, but brought a Japanese touch to the style with more defined forms. Very few of his works survive with Zhou Maoshu Appreciating Lotuses being an exception.

Kanō Masanobu would serve the Ashikaga shogunate as an official painter (御用絵師, goyō eshi), succeeding Sōtan to the post. Although Masanobu's father was a samurai, the family was provincial and therefore he did not hold a court rank. Instead of a rank, he had gained his position in service due to a mix of both achievement and social capital. This led to some criticism as aristocrat Shūzan Tōki expressed disdain towards Masanobu stating he was not a "born court painter."

Legacy 
The Kanō school would maintain its dominance as the dominant painting style for over 400 years from Masanobu's time up through the Meiji Restoration (1868). However, the school's style is neither purely nor mainly Masanobu's legacy, as the distinct Kanō style is linked more to Masanobu's son Kanō Motonobu, who took over as head of the school after Masanobu.

Genealogy 
Masanobu is said to be a descendant of Kanō Muneshige, a samurai of the Kamakura period of the Kanō clan, through his father, Kanō Kagenobu. Through this lineage, Masanobu would descend from the Fujiwara clan through the Kudō clan.

See also 
 Higashiyama Bunka in Muromachi period

References

External links

Bridge of dreams: the Mary Griggs Burke collection of Japanese art, a catalog from The Metropolitan Museum of Art Libraries (fully available online as PDF), which contains material on Kanō Masanobu (see index)

1430s births
1530s deaths
15th-century Japanese painters
16th-century Japanese painters
Kanō school
Buddhist artists
History of art in Japan